Francesca Barracciu (born 11 June 1966, Sorgono) is an Italian politician. She is a former Member of the European Parliament (MEP).

Early life and career 
Graduated in philosophy and pedagogy, she was a teacher of literary and Latin subjects at high schools as well as a consultant for cultural activities at public and private institutions.

Politics 
She entered politics in the 80's, militating in the PCI then PDS, DS and PD. She was regional secretary of Sardinian PD from July to December 2008. She has been assessor and municipal councilor of the municipality of Sorgono, as mayor of the same municipality from 2005 to 2010 (elected with 100% as the only candidate); she also was Regional Councilor of Sardinia from 2004 to 2013.

In 2009 he ran for the European Parliament in the ranks of the PD in the Islands constituency and obtained 116,844 preferences, making her the first of the non-elected, and then taking over from Rosario Crocetta on 17 December 2012, after his resignation for the election as President of the Sicilian Region. 

On 29 September 2013 he won the centre-left primary in the first round ahead of the regional elections in Sardinia in 2014 with 44.3% of the vote and 22,808 preferences. On the following 30 December, however, after some pressure from members of her party, she renounced to participate in the electoral competition, as she was investigated in the investigation into the "crazy expenses" of funds to regional groups, and was therefore replaced by economist Francesco Pigliaru, later elected President of Sardinia.

On 28 February 2014 she was appointed Undersecretary of State at the Ministry of Cultural Heritage and Activities and Tourism led by Minister Dario Franceschini, in the Renzi Government, resigning as MEP, ratified on 11 March 2014.

Her appointment caused serious perplexity as Matteo Renzi himself, at the time new secretary of PD, asked Barracciu to renounce the race as a center-left candidate for the Presidency of Sardinia despite the victory in the primary, two months from the vote, because investigated for the use of regional funds. However Renzi and the Minister of Reforms Maria Elena Boschi defended the appointment of Barracciu, and other undersecretaries under investigation, reiterating that the guarantee notice should not be judged as a definitive sentence.

In 2015 she ran for city councilor in her city Sorgono, in support of the mayoral candidate Vincenzo Rodi and his list "A future for Sorgono". The list, however, suffered a heavy defeat; the left-wing civic candidate, the trade unionist CGIL Giovanni Arru, was elected mayor, whose "Unita Mente" list obtained 68% (789 votes), surpassing Rodi stopped at 33% with 372 votes; however Barracciu with 88 votes is the most voted on the losing list after the mayoral candidate by entering the city council.

In November 2019 she left the PD and joined new Matteo Renzi's political party Italia Viva.

Judicial proceedings 
In September 2013 she was entered in the register of suspects together with 33 other exponents: two months later, the then MEP and candidate for governor, was heard by the prosecutor Marco Cocco to answer for the failure to report on expenses made by the regional council group between February 2006 and January 2009, for a total of thirty-three thousand euros in mileage reimbursements for fuel. 

On 21 October 2015 she was indicted on charges of having used public funds for purposes other than those envisaged, for an amount of approximately 81,000 euros, during her mandate as regional councilor of Sardinia from 2004 to 2013. Barracciu has announced her resignation as Undersecretary for Culture and Tourism of the Renzi government.

On 5 December 2017, the Court of Cagliari sentenced Barracciu to 4 years of imprisonment for aggravated embezzlement in the context of the scandal on funds destined for groups of the Regional Council of Sardinia and spent for non-institutional purposes. The total expenditure declared is around 80 thousand euros. In May 2019, the Cagliari Court of Appeal sentenced the former Undersecretary for Culture of the Renzi government to 3 years, 3 months and twenty days in prison.

References 

1966 births
Living people
Democratic Party (Italy) MEPs
MEPs for Italy 2009–2014
21st-century women MEPs for Italy
Democratic Party (Italy) politicians
Italia Viva politicians